Drag Kids is a Canadian documentary film, directed by Megan Wennberg and released in 2019. The film centres on Queen Lactatia, Laddy GaGa, Suzan Bee Anthony and Bracken Hanke, four young children from Canada, the United States and Europe who perform as drag entertainers, and performed together for the first time at Fierté Montréal in 2018.

The film premiered on April 28, 2019 at the Hot Docs Canadian International Documentary Festival in Toronto. In conjunction with its premiere, the stars performed at a drag brunch hosted by the city's Glad Day Bookshop. It also screened at the Inside Out Film and Video Festival the following month, and was announced as the winner of the festival's award for Best Canadian Feature.

The film had its broadcast premiere on the Documentary Channel on July 25, 2019. Concurrently with its broadcast premiere, it was added to the Canadian Broadcasting Corporation's streaming platform CBC Gem.

Its debut in United States was October 24, 2019 at NewFest in New York City. The film went into wide release in 2020.

References

External links

2019 films
Canadian documentary films
Canadian LGBT-related films
2019 LGBT-related films
Drag (clothing)-related films
Documentary films about LGBT culture
English-language Canadian films
Films about children
Transgender-related documentary films
2019 documentary films
2010s English-language films
2010s Canadian films